Ghermanville is an unincorporated community in northeastern Iron County, in the U.S. state of Missouri. The community was located approximately one-half mile east of Graniteville adjacent to Missouri Route 21.

History
A post office called Ghermanville was established in 1889, and remained in operation until 1894. The community was named after a local merchant.

References

Unincorporated communities in Iron County, Missouri
Unincorporated communities in Missouri